Carlos Braga (born 4 December 1920) was a Portuguese sailor. He competed in the Flying Dutchman event at the 1960 Summer Olympics.

References

External links
 

1920 births
Possibly living people
Portuguese male sailors (sport)
Olympic sailors of Portugal
Sailors at the 1960 Summer Olympics – Flying Dutchman
Sportspeople from Porto